Greg MacMaster is an American politician from Michigan. A Republican, MacMaster is a former member of the Michigan House of Representatives, representing the 105th district from 2011 until 2014.

MacMaster was born in Inglewood, California. He served in the United States Air Force for 10 years. He also worked as a TV and radio weatherman.

In 2014, MacMaster ran unsuccessfully for the 37th district of the Michigan Senate, losing in the primary to Wayne Schmidt.

Sources
State House bio of MacMaster
state senate campaign site

Living people
Republican Party members of the Michigan House of Representatives
People from Inglewood, California
1962 births
21st-century American politicians